Rayanapadu railway station (station code - RYP) is an Indian Railways station in Rayanapadu, Vijayawada of Andhra Pradesh. It lies on Kazipet - Vijayawada section of New Delhi - Chennai main line. It is administered under Vijayawada railway division of the South Central Railway zone. It is used as a bypass station to reduce congestion of the rail traffic on Vijayawada Junction.

Classification 
In terms of earnings and outward passengers handled, Rayanapadu is categorized as a Non-Suburban Grade-6 (NSG-6) railway station. Based on the re–categorization of Indian Railway stations for the period of 2017–18 and 2022–23, an NSG–6 category station earns nearly  crore and handles close to  passengers.

See also 
List of railway stations in India

References 

Railway stations in Krishna district
Vijayawada railway division